Ita Clare Buttrose  (born 17 January 1942) is an Australian TV network chairperson, television and radio personality, author and former magazine editor, publishing executive and newspaper journalist.

She was the founding editor of Cleo, a high-circulation magazine aimed at women aged 20 to 40 that was frank about sexuality (and, in its infancy, featured nude male centrefolds) and, later, the editor of the more conventional The Australian Women's Weekly. She was the youngest person to be appointed editor of The Weekly, which was then, per capita, the largest-selling magazine in the world.

Buttrose was a panelist on the Network Ten morning program Studio 10 from 2013 until 2018.

In 2019 Prime Minister Scott Morrison announced Buttrose as the new chair of the Australian Broadcasting Corporation (ABC).

Early life

Buttrose was born at Potts Point, Sydney, and named after her maternal grandmother, Ita Clare Rodgers (née Rosenthal), pronounced  (rhyming with 'fighter'). She was raised as a Catholic by her parents. Buttrose's father, Charles Oswald Buttrose, was a journalist and at one time the editor of The Daily Mirror in Sydney. By her own account she had decided on a career in journalism at the age of 11. Buttrose spent her first five years in New York City when her father was the New York correspondent for The Daily Mirror. She has Jewish ancestry on her maternal side.

The family returned to Australia in 1949 and settled in the harbourside suburb of Vaucluse. Her parents divorced during her teens, after 25 years of marriage, and details of her father's private life were printed in the tabloid press, causing considerable anguish to her mother. Buttrose briefly attended a private school but because her father could not afford the fees she was then moved to a public school. She completed her secondary education at Dover Heights Home Science High School, leaving at 15 to begin her career. She started her career at Australian Consolidated Press, owned by the Packer family, working as a copy girl at The Australian Women's Weekly, then became a cadet journalist on The Daily Telegraph and The Sunday Telegraph in Sydney. Her first byline came in 1959 when the 17-year-old covered the Australian tour by Princess Alexandra.

Career
Buttrose was appointed women's editor of the Telegraph at just 23 years old. In 1966 she won a racetrack fashion contest run by a rival newspaper, for which the first prize was an overseas trip, including a visit to Expo 67 in Montreal. Buttrose and her husband then stopped in England in 1967 where she worked for a time on the British national magazine Woman's Own before giving birth to her first child, a daughter, Kate. It was after her daughter's birth that she received a telegram from Sir Frank Packer, head of Australian Consolidated Press, offering her back her former job as women's editor at the Telegraph. The family then returned to Australia.

In 1971 Buttrose was chosen as founding editor of a new Australian women's magazine. This was originally to have been an Australian edition of the renowned American magazine Cosmopolitan, but the deal fell through after Hearst Magazines sold the Cosmopolitan rights to longtime Packer rivals Fairfax, so Packer and Buttrose set about creating a new publication, dubbed Cleo which they launched in 1972, several months ahead of its rival. Cleo was an instant hit, selling its entire original print run in just two days; the magazine broke new ground in Australian mainstream publishing, featuring the first nude male centrefold (actor Jack Thompson) and frank articles on female sexuality and other topics, leading to the inclusion of the first sealed section in an Australian magazine. During the early months of the magazine, Buttrose became pregnant with her second child, Ben, but with the grudging support of the Packers she worked through her pregnancy; an unusual feat for that time as it was still common for women to have to give up work permanently after they became pregnant.

Buttrose edited Cleo until 1975, when she was appointed editor of the Packers' flagship magazine, The Australian Women's Weekly (1975–76), then she became editor-in-chief of both publications from 1976 to 1978, before being appointed Publisher of Australian Consolidated Press Women's Division from 1978 to 1981. In 1981 she left the Packers after their rival Rupert Murdoch offered her the job of Editor-in-Chief of the Daily Telegraph and Sunday Telegraph in 1981, making her the first female editor of a major metropolitan newspaper in Australia, a position she held until 1984; she was also appointed to the board of News Limited. She made frequent appearances on radio and TV and in 1980, her media prominence led to her becoming the subject of the song "Ita", recorded by rock band Cold Chisel, which was included on their successful East album.

Buttrose was the chairperson of the National Advisory Committee on AIDS (NACAIDS) from 1984 until 1988. On one occasion, she appeared personally in a nationwide TV campaign to explain that donating blood at a blood bank did not pose a risk of catching AIDS (the fear of which had caused a significant drop in donations).

After her stint with News Limited, Buttrose founded her own publishing company, Capricorn Publishing, and launched her own magazine, Ita, but this eventually folded and she launched a new company, the Good Life Publishing Company, which in 2005 published bark!, a lifestyle magazine aimed at dog owners.

Author 

Buttrose is also a prolific author and has published nine books, including her autobiography, A Passionate Life. In 2011 Penguin published A Guide to Australian Etiquette.

Television

Buttrose was a regular on Beauty and the Beast in the 1990s and early 2000s. Buttrose was also a regular commentator on the Nine Network breakfast show Today and was at one point considered to replace Kerri-Anne Kennerley in the network's morning slot.

In June 2013, Buttrose joined Network Ten where she hosted morning program Studio 10 two mornings a week for the station alongside Joe Hildebrand, Sarah Harris, Denise Drysdale and Jessica Rowe. The show premiered in late 2013. However, 2016 saw Buttrose reduce her appearances on the program to just twice a week to spend more time with her grandchildren.

Ita made a cameo appearance in episode 7547 of The Bold and the Beautiful alongside Brendan Jones and Amanda Keller as a news reporter airing in March 2017.

In April 2018, Buttrose resigned as panelist on Studio 10 to focus on other parts of her life, including spending more time with her grandchildren and writing.

Since leaving Network Ten, Buttrose has appeared on The Morning Show on the Seven Network and filled in for Sonia Kruger on Today Extra on the Nine Network. In 2019 she was appointed chairman of the Australian Broadcasting Corporation (ABC).

Honours and legacy

Buttrose was made an Officer of the Order of the British Empire (OBE) in 1979, and appointed an Officer of the Order of Australia (AO) in 1988. In 2003, she was awarded the Centenary Medal. Buttrose was inducted to the Victorian Honour Roll of Women in 2001, and advanced to Companion of the Order of Australia in 2019.

In August 2017 Buttrose was recognised for Outstanding Lifetime Achievement at the annual Kennedy Awards for Excellence in Journalism.

In 1984 she was named the Variety Club 'Personality of the Year' as well as winning the Australasian Academy of Broadcast, Arts and Sciences for the 'Most Promising Newcomer to Radio'. In 1993 Buttrose was named Juvenile Diabetes Foundation's 'Australian of the Year'. In 2011 she was elected President of Alzheimer's Australia until end of June 2014. She is currently an ambassador for Alzheimer's Australia.

In January 2013, Buttrose was named the 2013 Australian of the Year. She was awarded an honorary Doctor of Letters degree by Macquarie University in 2014 in recognition of her contribution to the arts. In 2015, she was awarded a second honorary Doctor of Letters degree by the University of Wollongong for her distinguished service to Australian society and for her commitment to advocating for vulnerable people in the community. She was awarded an honorary Doctor of the university degree by the University of New South Wales in 2018 in recognition of her eminent service to health, and for being an inspirational role model for aspiring women in business and for those wanting to make a difference in society.

Among her many other public service and charitable activities, Buttrose is a patron of Women of Vision, World Vision Australia, the Macular Disease Foundation of Australia, the University of Third Age, the Juvenile Diabetes Foundation of Australia, Amarant, the National Menopause Foundation, the Sydney Women's Festival, Safety House and the National Institute of Secretaries and Administrators.

Buttrose is also an ambassador of the Australian Women Chamber of Commerce (AWCCI) and sits on the AWCCI Advisory Board. She works on the professional speakers' circuit, and is associated with Saxton Speakers.

TV biopic Paper Giants

In April 2011, Buttrose and Cleo were the subject of the ABC-TV two-part telemovie Paper Giants: The Birth of Cleo, starring Asher Keddie as Buttrose, Rob Carlton as Kerry Packer and Tony Barry as Frank Packer.

Personal life

At 21 years of age, Buttrose married architect Alasdair "Mac" Macdonald and had two children. 
In 1975, while editing The Australian Women's Weekly, her marriage to Macdonald broke down and the couple divorced in 1976. Later she met Peter Sawyer and they married in 1979. By her own account it was "not a very happy marriage"; Sawyer left in 1980 and they subsequently divorced.

Buttrose cared for her father after he was diagnosed with vascular dementia. He died in 1999.

In his 2007 book Who Killed Channel Nine?, former Nine Network producer Gerald Stone claimed that Buttrose and Kerry Packer conducted a private but intense affair during Buttrose's tenure on Cleo. Stone also claimed that Packer even offered to marry her but she rejected the idea and they split after a "blazing row". Buttrose herself has repeatedly declined to comment on the matter.

Buttrose resides in Sydney.

List of works
Buttrose has authored or co-authored 10 books:

 A Guide to Australian Etiquette (2011)
 Eating for Eye Health: the Macular Degeneration Cookbook, co-authored with Sydney chef Vanessa Jones (2009)
 Get in Shape: A complete workout for strength, health & vitality, co-authored with Lee Campbell (2007)
 Motherguilt: Australian women reveal their true feelings about Motherhood, co-authored with Dr Penny Adams (2005; reprinted 2006)
 How Much Is Enough? Your Financial Roadmap to a Happy Retirement, co- authored with Will Buttrose and Mike Galgut (2003)
 What is Love? (2000)
 A Word to the Wise (1999)
 A Passionate Life (1998; updated paperback version published 2001)
 Every Occasion: The Guide to Modern Etiquette (1985)
 Early Edition: My First Forty Years (1985)

Chapter profile 
 "Ita Buttrose AO, OBE: Journalist, businesswoman, television personality and author", pp. [52]-55, in: The world we see: leadership lessons from Australia's iconic change makers, Sarah Liu, 2016

Introductions
 Foreword: Martins, Ralph and Ragg, Mark. Understanding Alzheimer's: the complete Australian guide to the management and prevention of Alzheimer's (2013, Pan Macmillan Australia).

References

External links

 
 

1942 births
Australian businesspeople
Australian journalists
Australian magazine editors
Australian radio personalities
Living people
Companions of the Order of Australia
Australian Officers of the Order of the British Empire
Recipients of the Centenary Medal
Founders
Australian women in business
Australian of the Year Award winners
Women founders
Women magazine editors
Chairpersons of the Australian Broadcasting Corporation
Australian memoirists
Australian women editors
Australian women radio presenters